Hornet Squadron is the name of a fictional Royal Flying Corps, and later Royal Air Force, fighter squadron featured in a number of novels by British author Derek Robinson.

Hornet Squadron first appeared in Robinson's 1983 novel Piece of Cake, which spans the period from the start of the Second World War through the Battle of Britain.  In 1988 Piece of Cake became a 6-part television mini-series.  In the book the squadron flies the Hawker Hurricane while in the television series, the Supermarine Spitfire is flown.

The next Hornet Squadron book was War Story (1987) set in 1916 during the First World War. It was followed by Hornet's Sting (1991) set in 1917.  These Hornet Squadron novels became prequels to Robinson's first book, Goshawk Squadron (1971) which was set in 1918.  Despite the different squadron names, there are common characters linking the books. The World War I books sees the squadron operating F.E.2 fighters.

The final Hornet Squadron book was A Good Clean Fight (1993) which picks up the story of the squadron  post-Piece of Cake when it was fighting with the Desert Air Force in 1942.

References

Fictional military organizations
Literary characters introduced in 1983